The 1921 Baden state election was held on 30 October 1921 to elect the 86 members of the Landtag of the Republic of Baden.

Results

References 

1921 elections in Germany
1921